John Visman Meneses (born 5 March 1984) is a Colombian footballer who most recently played for América de Cali in the Categoría Primera B as a goalkeeper.

References

External links
 Official Website
 

1984 births
Living people
Categoría Primera A players
Categoría Primera B players
Colombian footballers
Deportivo Cali footballers
Atlético La Sabana footballers
Atlético F.C. footballers
América de Cali footballers
Unión Magdalena footballers
Association football goalkeepers
Sportspeople from Valle del Cauca Department